Duplicaria costellifera, common name Thaanum's auger, is a species of sea snail, a marine gastropod mollusk in the family Terebridae, subfamily Pervicaciinae, the auger snails.

Description
The size of an adult shell varies between 33.8 mm and 95 mm.

Distribution
This species is found in the Pacific Ocean off Hawaii.

References

 Bratcher T. & Cernohorsky W.O. (1987). Living terebras of the world. A monograph of the recent Terebridae of the world. American Malacologists, Melbourne, Florida & Burlington, Massachusetts. 240pp
 Terryn Y. (2007). Terebridae: A Collectors Guide. Conchbooks & NaturalArt. 59pp + plates

External links
 Gastropods.com : Acus thaanumi; accessed : 31 March 2011
 Pease W. H. (1869). Description of new species of marine Gasteropodæ inhabiting Polynesia. American Journal of Conchology. 5: 64–79
 Fedosov, A. E.; Malcolm, G.; Terryn, Y.; Gorson, J.; Modica, M. V.; Holford, M.; Puillandre, N. (2020). Phylogenetic classification of the family Terebridae (Neogastropoda: Conoidea). Journal of Molluscan Studies

Terebridae
Gastropods described in 1869